"Turnin' Me On" is a song recorded by American country music singer Blake Shelton. It is the third single from his 2017 album Texoma Shore and would be used for Shelton's other album Fully Loaded: God's Country. Shelton wrote the song with Josh Osborne and Jessi Alexander.

Content
Shelton said that he was inspired to write a song about his girlfriend, actress and singer Gwen Stefani in 2017. He began writing a melody on his guitar while on his tour bus, and invited Josh Osborne and Jessi Alexander to help him finish the song. The song indirectly references Stefani by name-dropping the cosmetics company Revlon, for whom Stefani is a spokesperson.

In October 2018, Shelton released an acoustic video for the song, which features him performing the song at the Henson Recording Studio.

Music video
The acoustic vertical music video was directed by Chris Rogers and premiered on CMT, GAC & CMT Music in October 2018.

Charts

Peaking at number one on the Bubbling Under Hot 100 Singles chart, "Turnin' Me On" became the first single of Shelton's career (serviced to country radio) to fail to chart the Billboard Hot 100 since "The More I Drink" in 2007. However, the single peaked at number 10 on the Billboard Hot Country Airplay chart: maintaining an active string of top 10 country airplay hits dating back to his 2008 cover of Michael Bublé's "Home".

Weekly charts

Year-end charts

References

2017 songs
2018 singles
Blake Shelton songs
Songs written by Jessi Alexander
Songs written by Josh Osborne
Songs written by Blake Shelton
Song recordings produced by Scott Hendricks
Warner Records Nashville singles